Kirt Niedrigh is a fictional character, a semi-reformed supervillain, and sometimes antihero in the DC Comics Universe. Created by Cary Bates and Mike Grell, Niedrigh is a former hopeful for the Legion of Super-Heroes under the guise of Absorbancy Boy. After being rejected from the team, years later he resurfaced as Earth-Man leading a group of supervillains calling themselves the "Justice League of Earth", which help to enforce a xenophobic agenda that Earth has adopted. He first appears in Superboy and the Legion of Super-Heroes #218 (July 1976), and reappeared as Earth-Man in Action Comics #858 (Late December 2007), the first part of the "Superman and the Legion of Super-Heroes" story arc.

Fictional character biography

Absorbancy Boy
As a teenager, Kirt Niedrigh applied for membership in the Legion of Super-Heroes. Calling himself Absorbancy Boy, and possessing the ability to absorb the energy residue of any super-powered being, gaining their powers himself, he was rejected on the grounds that his powers were too limited. In the rebooted continuity of New Earth, his rejection was further elaborated upon, explaining that while his powers had the potential to develop in time, Saturn Girl had analyzed his mind, finding a deep streak of antisocial and evil tendencies that Kirt was unwilling to keep in check, and foreshadowed his transformation into the xenophobic villain he would be in his maturity.

Incensed at his rejection, Niedrigh found the costume of "Zoraz", a fake villain used as a final test for new Legionnaires. Both Superboy and Sun Boy had used the costume earlier. Attacking the Legion and defeating them, Niedrigh revealed himself, believing that he had earned his place on the team. The Legion did not see things this way, and Superboy attempted to confiscate the suit. Niedrigh used the suit's residual Sun Boy energies to project red sun radiation, then absorbed Superboy's powers and defeated the Kryptonian. Niedrigh was then defeated by Legion applicant Tyroc, who used an ultrasonic scream to overwhelm his newly acquired super-hearing. Immediately thereafter, Tyroc is inducted into the Legion.

Earth-Man
Niedrigh resurfaced in the 2007–2008 storyline, "Superman and the Legion of Super-Heroes". Now calling himself Earth-Man, he claimed to have discovered a crystal tablet in the Arctic which proved that Superman was not an alien, but a human who was granted powers by Mother Earth to protect the Earth from alien invaders. Using this knowledge, Earth-Man was able to sow distrust and hatred of aliens among the people of Earth, resulting in its seceding from the United Planets, and all aliens on Earth being violently captured and deported. Earth-Man gathered a group of fellow Earth-born Legion rejects, (Tusker, Radiation Roy, Eyeful Ethel, Storm Boy, Golden Boy and Spider Girl) and formed the Justice League of Earth, a group purporting to uphold Superman's ideals. Earth-Man captured many Legion members, absorbing their powers for his own, and using the Legionnaire Sun Boy to turn many of the suns in the galaxy red.

In desperation, the remaining members of the Legion brought Superman to the 31st century, and together they stormed the JLE's satellite headquarters. Earth-Man personally took on Superman, almost defeating him until Brainiac 5 freed Sun Boy. With Earth's sun once again yellow, Superman could fight Earth-Man on equal terms. The return of Superman's powers, coupled with Earth-Man's indiscriminate attacks, convinced the people of New Metropolis that they had been lied to. Earth-Man held his own against Superman until the freed Legion members arrived, and he was defeated by their combined numbers. Earth-Man and his JLE were taken to the prison planet Takron-Galtos.

It was later revealed that the crystal tablet Earth-Man found had been planted in the Arctic by the Time Trapper in an attempt to separate Superman from the Legion.

Earth-Man and the rest of the JLE appear as members of the new Legion of Super-Villains in Final Crisis: Legion of 3 Worlds. He states that the alliance is only temporary, since the villains all want the same thing: death to the Legion.

Following the defeat of the combined JLE-LSV, Earth-Man is again imprisoned, until the Earth Government, eager to mollify his pro-human supporters, forces the Legion to offer him membership in return for allowing the Legion to remain on Earth. While mulling over their offer, however, Earth-Man is also offered a Green Lantern ring by Dyogene, a creature from within the planet Oa. Earth-Man accepts the Legion's offer, but secretly uses his Lantern ring to deactivate the failsafe that Brainiac 5 placed in his Legion flight ring to keep his power in check. Despite this breach of faith, he still acts in the Legion's favor during an anti-alien riot. Afterwards, back in his quarters, he asks the Lantern ring how it works, and it produces a power battery and tells him the recharging oath. He then reveals the ring to the Legion, and is taken by it to the planet Xerifos, which the ring has its inhabitants are in need of help. Upon arrival, Earth-Man is attacked by the planet's native creatures, which the ring will not let him attack, as they are sentient. He is saved by Sun Boy (under duress), and, after finding out from the ring that the planet's atmosphere needs to be altered, absorbs and joins with Element Lad's power's to do so. Earth-Man then discards the ring, declaring that he will not be led around by it, and returns to Earth with the Legion. Dyogene then appears taking back the ring.

Back on Earth, Earth-Man is approached by his former xenophobic colleagues, who want him to help attack refugees from Titan. Not only does he refuse, but Earth-Man also helps the Legion defeat the xenophobe's army, and leads the Legion to their headquarters, apprehending them. That same night, Phantom Girl catches him in bed with Shadow Lass.

A short while afterward, Earth-Man discovers that Brainiac 5 had altered his flight ring to increase his sense of morality. Bringing Brainy the wrecked ring, Earth-Man declares that he will remain on the team and continue helping aliens despite his dislike for them.

When the Legion face off against an ancient being known as the Bringer of Chaos, Earth-Man absorbs the powers of both his fellow Legionnaires and the villain himself. Earth-Man kills the villain, but dies himself in the confrontation. Shadow Lass takes his body back to Earth, proclaiming him to be a true champion.

During the Five Years Later period of the Legion's history, Niedrigh was mentioned as having been mind-wiped by the Dominators. Whether or not this is still a part of Legion continuity is at present uncertain.

Powers and abilities
Niedrigh has the ability to absorb and duplicate the superpowers of metahumans and aliens. However he is not able to copy the knowledge or skills, so it will normally take time for him to master a new power. He absorbs energies of people within a certain range of him, anywhere from several feet to a mile radius. He has shown the capacity to manifest numerous powers at the same time. The absorbed powers only last for twelve hours at a time.

Weaknesses
Earth-Man occasionally shows difficulty in juggling multiple powers, and his body can be overloaded by absorbing too many at once. Usually the Earth-Man loses his duplicated abilities once out of range of the owner, but theoretically due to the length of time spent with them.

Equipment
As a member of the Legion of Super-Heroes he is provided with a Legion Flight Ring. It allows him to fly and protects him from the vacuum of space and other dangerous environments. His ring has however been modified in order to keep him on a short leash and alter his morality. Earth-Man also temporarily possessed a Green Lantern ring given to him by Dyogene, a creature from within the planet Oa. This gives him all the abilities of the Green Lantern Corps.

Other versions

Smallville Season 11
Kirt Niedrigh appears in the "Argo" arc of Smallville Season 11, a comic book continuation of the television series Smallville, as a member of the EarthGov army and Minister at odds with New Krypton.

References

Comics characters introduced in 2007
Comics characters introduced in 1976
DC Comics supervillains
DC Comics superheroes
Characters created by Geoff Johns
Characters created by Mike Grell
Green Lantern Corps officers